Lalamove is an Asia-based technology company that provides delivery services by connecting users with delivery drivers on its mobile and web apps. The company operates in cities across Asia and Latin America connecting over 7 million users with more than 700,000 delivery drivers. Lalamove services are currently available in Hong Kong, Taipei, Singapore, Kuala Lumpur, Manila, Cebu, Bangkok, Pattaya, Ho Chi Minh City, Hanoi, Jakarta, Dhaka, São Paulo, Rio de Janeiro and Mexico City. Lalamove expanded their services in India in 2018 but later got banned by Indian government in 2020 during the series of Chinese app bans in India.

History
The company was founded in Hong Kong in December 2013 by Shing Chow Shing-yuk. Originally called Easyvan, the company was renamed Lalamove in 2014. The company quickly expanded to new markets reaching Singapore in 2014 and Bangkok and Taipei in 2015. By 2018 Lalamove was present in 11 cities across Southeast Asia and also commenced operations in India.

Lalamove expanded for the first time outside of Asia in 2019 by commencing operations in Latin America. They are currently present in São Paulo, Rio de Janeiro and Mexico City.

In 2019, Lalamove raised US$300 million in a series D round of funding.

In March 2020, Lalamove made its first strategic investment by participating in a pre-series B funding round for logistics company Inteluck.

During the COVID-19 epidemic in 2020, Lalamove launched its Deliver Care CSR initiative to provide free delivery to NGOs. The CSR initiative helped deliver over 200,000 essential items including face masks, hand sanitiser, personal protection equipment and hot meals to frontline medical works and underprivileged families. In total more than 86,000 beneficiaries were reached. Lalamove also partnered with Quezon City local government to launch the LalaJeep, a new delivery type on the Lalamove app, to help jeepney drivers who were displaced from work due to the community quarantine.

On 24 November 2020, the Government of India banned 45 Chinese apps, including Lalamove, from operating in India after citing security concerns.

In January 2022, reports emerged that Lalamove, along with cargo delivery subsidiaries of DiDi and 58.com had been summoned by local transportation regulators in Shanghai, after a rising number of cases where drivers provide illegal freight services were noted to originate from the platforms. Lalamove was ordered to rectify these practices that the authorities described as “damage that stems from disorderly expansion". In the same month, Lalamove had already been one of eight companies to be summoned by China's Ministry of Transportation and warned about unclear pricing schemes, rising membership fees, unfair competition, and illegal transportation.

See also
 GoGoVan
 List of unicorn startup companies

References
11. "Chinese lala cannot move in india"

12. https://www.techinasia.com/india-halts-lalamove-exstaff-launch-similar-app 

Logistics companies of Hong Kong
Transport companies established in 2013